Podgorica pri Črnučah is a formerly independent settlement in the northern part of the capital Ljubljana in central Slovenia. It is part of the traditional region of Upper Carniola and is now included with the rest of the municipality in the Central Slovenia Statistical Region.

Geography
Podgorica pri Črnučah is a sprawling settlement with a clustered core along the old road from Šentjakob ob Savi to Domžale nestled against the southeast slope of Podgorica Hill (also , 375 m), which further transitions to Soteska Hill (406 m). Fields lie northeast and southeast of the village, and the soil is sandy and fertile.

Name
Podgorica pri Črnučah literally means 'Podgorica near Črnuče'; the name Podgorica is a fused prepositional phrase that has lost case inflection, composed of pod 'under' + gorica 'hill'. Like similar names (e.g., Podgorje), this describes the physical location of the settlement. In the local dialect, the settlement is known as Podgarca. Podgorica was renamed Podgorica pri Črnučah in 1953 to distinguish it from other settlements with the same name. The settlement was known as Podgoritz in German in the past.

History
Podgorica pri Črnučah was mentioned in written sources in 1300. During the Second World War, seven people burned to death on August 9, 1944, when German forces attacked a house containing a Partisan checkpoint. A nuclear reactor operated by the Jožef Stefan Institute was built east of the village in 1965. Podgorica pri Črnučah was annexed by the City of Ljubljana in 1984, ending its existence as an independent settlement.

References

External links

Podgorica pri Črnučah on Geopedia

Localities of Ljubljana
Črnuče District